A list of films released in Japan in 1962 (see 1962 in film).

List of films

See also 
1962 in Japan

References

Footnotes

Sources

External links
Japanese films of 1962 at the Internet Movie Database

1962
Japanese
Films